West Traverse Township is a civil township of Emmet County in the U.S. state of Michigan.  The population was 1,606 at the 2010 census.

Communities

The historic Little Traverse Lighthouse is located at the tip of the Harbor Point peninsula. It was begun as a resort originally called Lansing Resort in 1878.

Geography
The city of Harbor Springs is located south of the township.

References

Notes

Sources

External links
West Traverse Township Website

Townships in Emmet County, Michigan
Townships in Michigan
Michigan populated places on Lake Michigan